Chaar Sahibzaade 2: Rise of Banda Singh Bahadur is 2016 Indian Punjabi-language 3D computer-animated film, directed and produced by Harry Baweja. It is a sequel to the 2014 film Chaar Sahibzaade. The film was released on 11 November 2016.

Plot
The film is based on the struggle between Khalsa and Mughals. After the Battle of Muktsar, Guru Gobind Singh settled at Nanded. There he met Madho Das later Banda Singh Bahadur. Guru Gobind Singh baptised him and sent him along with Baj Singh, Binod Singh, Ram Singh, Daya Singh, Kahan Singh and 20 other Sikhs to Khanda, India to fight mughal tyranny in Punjab and also gave him Hukamnama for Sikhs to join his army on the way.

Banda Bahadur Singh camped at Bharatpur and freed the people of a village from local robbers. Then he fought Battle of Sonipat, Battle of Ambala and Kaithal and conquered them. In the Battle of Samana Banda Singh gained marvellous victory. At Samana Banda made land reforms and abolished zamindari system and granted property rights to tillers of the land.

Then he fought battles at Malerkotla, Ghuram, Kesar, Shahabad, Ambala, Mustafabad, Nahan, Kapuri and conquered them. He fought the Battle of Rahon (1710) and captured Rahon. Thereafter Banda fought the Battle of Sadhaura and killed faujdar Osman Khan of Sadhaura.

In the Battle of Chappar Chiri Sikhs defeated mughal army, Sikh General Fateh Singh beheaded Wazir Khan. Sikhs also killed Diwan Suchananda and Banda establish first Khalsa Raj in Punjab.

Marketing
On 13 October 2016, Eros Now Punjabi launched the official trailer of the film in Punjabi and Hindi language.

A virtual reality game has been installed to the theatres for younger audiences.

Soundtrack
The soundtrack of the movie is composed by Harry Baweja, Jaidev Kumar, Rabbi Shergill and Nirmal Singh. The song "Hun Kis Theen" is based on the poetry of Bulleh Shah.

Critical reception
The film received mixed reviews from critics. Rohit Vats of Hindustan Times gave the film 2.5 star out of 5. He praised the voice over and certain portions of the film but criticised the running time and the animation. Jasmine Singh of The Tribune who gave 4.5 stars out of 5 to the first film gave just 2 stars to the film saying "Chaar Sahibzaade- Rise of Banda Singh Bahadur sets high standard in animation, but in terms of story and screenplay the film could not blow the victory trumpet.". Nihit Bhave of The Times of India gave the film 3 stars praising the story but criticised the animation as he felt that " It is like watching Baahubali through a Chota Bheem filter.". The Indian Express gave the movie 2.5 stars out of 5 stating "Overall, this epic story will appeal only to Sikhs and those who have a keen interest in history."

Box office
In its first weekend, the film grossed 38.5 million from overseas.

The film collected 89.9 million from overseas at the end of 7 weeks.

Awards

See also
 Punjabi cinema
 List of indian animated feature films

References

External links 
 

Films set in Punjab, India
Indian 3D films
Indian animated films
2016 films
Films shot in India
Indian historical films
Films directed by Harry Baweja
Punjabi-language Indian films
2010s Punjabi-language films
Films scored by Jaidev Kumar
Films scored by Harry Baweja
Films about Sikhism
Films set in the Sikh Empire
Indian computer-animated films
Cultural depictions of Indian monarchs
Cultural depictions of Aurangzeb
Films set in the Mughal Empire
Cultural depictions of Sikh gurus
2010s historical films
2016 3D films
Memorials to Guru Gobind Singh